Marissa Baks (born 5 December 1998) is a Dutch professional racing cyclist, who currently rides for UCI Women's Continental Team .

References

External links

1998 births
Living people
Dutch female cyclists
Place of birth missing (living people)
21st-century Dutch women